R. Begum is a Bangladesh Awami League politician and the former Member of Parliament of Mymensingh-3.

Career
Begum was elected to parliament from Mymensingh-3 as a Bangladesh Awami League candidate in 1992 in a by-election following the death of incumbent member of parliament, Nazrul Islam.

References

Awami League politicians
Living people
5th Jatiya Sangsad members
Women members of the Jatiya Sangsad
Year of birth missing (living people)